The 1939–40 Western Kentucky State Teachers Hilltoppers men's basketball team represented Western Kentucky State Normal School and Teachers College (now known as Western Kentucky University) during the 1939-40 NCAA basketball season. The team was led by future Naismith Memorial Basketball Hall of Fame coach Edgar Diddle and All-American center Carlisle Towery.  The Hilltoppers won the Kentucky Intercollegiate Athletic Conference and Southern Intercollegiate Athletic Association championships, and received an invitation to the 1940 NCAA basketball tournament.
This was the first team from Kentucky to participate in the NCAA tournament  Herb Ball and Howard “Tip” Downing were selected to the All-SIAA team, while Towery made the All-KIAC Team.

Schedule

|-
!colspan=6| Regular Season

|-

 

|-
!colspan=6| 1940 Kentucky Intercollegiate Athletic Conference Tournament

|-
!colspan=6| 1940 Southern Intercollegiate Athletic Association Tournament

|-
!colspan=6| 1940 NCAA basketball tournament

References

Western Kentucky Hilltoppers basketball seasons
Western Kentucky State Teachers
Western Kentucky State Teachers